WBCP (1580 AM) was a radio station licensed to  Urbana, Illinois and serving the Champaign, Illinois area. The station was last owned by P & C Enterprises, Inc.

History
The station was established as a daytime only operation in 1948 as WKID. Call letters were later changed to WCCR in 1969, WJTX in 1984, and WBCP in 1990.  Nominated for a Gospel Stellar Award in 2017 for small market with one of the newest gospel show Lady Lynn Live Gospel Show. Lady Lynn Live as the Station Manager from 2009 to 2019, bringing notice to the gospel community.

In 2010 it was reported that WBCP's  daytime power of 135 wattts was the lowest for any licensed AM station in the United States. Its license expired December 1, 2020.

References

External links
FCC Station Search Details: DWBCP (Facility ID: 71211)
FCC History Cards for WBCP  (covering 1947-1981 as WKID / WCCR )

BCP
Urbana, Illinois
1948 establishments in Illinois
Radio stations established in 1948
Defunct radio stations in the United States
Radio stations disestablished in 2020
2020 disestablishments in Illinois
BCP